Mycobacteria that form colonies clearly visible to the naked eye in more than 7 days on subculture are termed slow growers.

They can cause disease in humans.

List of slowly growing Mycobacteria

Nonchromogenic

Rough
 Mycobacterium africanum
 Mycobacterium bovis
 Mycobacterium leprae
 Mycobacterium lacus
 Mycobacterium lepraemurium
 Mycobacterium microti
 Mycobacterium pinnipedii
 Mycobacterium shottsii
 Mycobacterium tuberculosis

Smooth
 Mycobacterium branderi
 Mycobacterium heidelbergense
 Mycobacterium intracellulare
 Mycobacterium malmoense

Smooth to rough
 Mycobacterium gastri
 Mycobacterium haemophilum

Small and Transparent
 Mycobacterium avium avium
 Mycobacterium avium paratuberculosis
 Mycobacterium avium silvaticum
 Mycobacterium genavense
 Mycobacterium montefiorense
 Mycobacterium ulcerans

Photochromogenic 
 Mycobacterium intermedium

Yellow and smooth
Mycobacterium asiaticum
 Mycobacterium marinum

Yellow and rough
 Mycobacterium kansasii

Scotochromogenic

Yellow
 Mycobacterium conspicuum
 Mycobacterium botniense
 Mycobacterium farcinogenes
 Mycobacterium heckeshornense
 Mycobacterium interjectum
 Mycobacterium kubicae
 Mycobacterium lentiflavum
 Mycobacterium nebraskense
 Mycobacterium nebraskense
 Mycobacterium palustre
 Mycobacterium tusciae

Yellow-Orange
 Mycobacterium cookii
 Mycobacterium flavescens
 Mycobacterium gordonae

Rose-Pink
 Mycobacterium hiberniae

References

Bacteriology
S